Samayal Samayal with Venkatesh Bhat is a 2014-2018 Tamil language Indian television series featuring chef Venkatesh Bhat cooking 100 of his top recipes, that everyday-cooks and viewers can try. The program focuses on what have been described by Times of India as "exciting recipes, especially South Indian" cuisine.

The show premiered on 30 August 2014 and 30 June 2018 for 190 episodes, airs on Vijay TV every Saturday at 2pm, with repeat episodes sometimes aired at varying times. As of 2016, the show has completed 100 episodes.

Show format
The show features Venkatesh Bhat sharing his experience and knowledge with cooking techniques, and demonstrating 100 hand picked recipes from his cook book. The show also features various celebrities, including stars from other Vijay TV television programs such as Saravanan Meenatchi. Cook With Comali

The format of the show changed from the earlier version of the show entitled Samayal Samayal, which aired on Vijay TV in 2001 for half an hour on Sundays at 1pm. The format of that version featured both Sharmila and Venkatesh Bhat, and filming was before a live audience who participated in the show.

Seasons overview

Chef Bhat
The presenter of the show, Venkatesh Bhat, is both a chef and CEO. He comes from the Udupi-Mangalore belt. Notwithstanding Bhat being a strict vegetarian, Bhat is also proficient at non-vegetarian cooking.

Bhat studied catering at Asan Memorial, and obtained a graduate degree from Cornell University and majored in general management in his studies at Nanyang Technology University, Singapore. Bhat initially worked in the kitchens of Hotel Chola Sheraton in 1994. Two years later, he moved to Taj Coromandel as a management trainee in hotel operations and kitchen management before being promoted to the position of sous chef in 1998. In 2001, Bhat joined Leela Palace in Bangaluru as an executive sous chef and was promoted to corporate chef by 2004. Bhat quit corporate life in 2007 to become an entrepreneur, before launching several brands and restaurants including South Indies, Up South, and Bon South.

Bhat later joined Accord Metropolitan, as well as Accord Puducherry, and Highland Hotel in Ooty. During the daytime, he is a CEO of the hotels. During the evenings, he is a chef, and focuses on the hotel's Royal Indianaa restaurant which serves South Indian cuisine, as well as the hotel's other eateries including Pergola, the Zodiac Bar and the brick oven. In 2019, with Chef Damodharan, he judges Cooku with Comali.

List of episodes

References

External links
Star Vijay on Youtube
Star Vijay US
Star Vijay Malaysia

Star Vijay original programming
Tamil-language reality television series
Tamil-language cooking television series
Tamil-language talk shows
2010s Tamil-language television series
2014 Tamil-language television series debuts
Tamil-language television shows
2018 Tamil-language television series endings